Markus Töns (born 1 January 1964) is a German politician of the Social Democratic Party (SPD) who has been serving as a member of the Bundestag from the state of North Rhine-Westphalia since 2017.

Political career 
From 2005 until 2017 Töns served as a member of the Landtag of North Rhine-Westphalia. In this capacity, he also represented the state on the European Committee of the Regions from 2012 until 2017. 

Töns became a member of the Bundestag in the 2017 German federal election, representing Gelsenkirchen. In parliament, he is a member of the Committee on European Union Affairs and the Committee on Economic Affairs and Energy. In this capacity, he is his parliamentary group's rapporteur on Brexit.

Other activities 
 Business Forum of the Social Democratic Party of Germany, Member of the Political Advisory Board (since 2020)
 German United Services Trade Union (ver.di), Member

References

External links 

  
 Bundestag biography 

1964 births
Living people
Members of the Bundestag for North Rhine-Westphalia
Members of the Bundestag 2017–2021
Members of the Bundestag 2021–2025
Members of the Bundestag for the Social Democratic Party of Germany